Phet may refer to:
 Cyclone Phet, a cyclone formed in the Arabian Sea in 2010
 Amphetamine, a psychostimulant drug
 PhET Interactive Simulations, interactive science and math simulations